Burås is a village in Akershus, Norway

Buras may also refer to:
 Buras (surname)
 Buras, Louisiana
 Buras-Triumph, Louisiana

See also